Cyclotron is the name of two different characters appearing in American comic books published by DC Comics. Though a minor character, he holds an important place in the history of the Justice Society as a source of power and inspiration for both the Atom and Atom Smasher.

Publication history
Terry Curtis was originally an obscure one-shot Superman character in Action Comics #21 (1940) who was a scientist who was kidnapped by Ultra-Humanite and forced to build an "atomic disintegrator".

Roy Thomas reinvented the character as Cyclotron, a reluctant supervillain, in All-Star Squadron #21 (1983) from DC Comics. He was one of the few original villains retroactively added to DC's Golden Age era in the series.

Fictional character biography

Terry Curtis
Cyclotron was an atomic scientist in the 1930s and 1940s named Terry Curtis (born Terrence Kurtzenberg, he had later Anglicized his name). In the past, he had had a brief romantic relationship with Dannette Reilly, the second Firebrand. Curtis was eventually kidnapped by the villainous Ultra-Humanite (whose brain was in Delores Winters' body at the time) who sought to make use of the scientist's expertise with atomic energy. He was subjected to the Ultra-Humanite's experiments and exposed to radiation which granted him superhuman abilities.

Used as a pawn by the villain, Curtis was forced to go up against the heroic All-Star Squadron. In the process, he waged battle with the original Atom, exposing the hero to powerful radiation. This later became the source of the Atom's own superhuman abilities. Cyclotron died trying to be a hero by taking the Ultra-Humanite into the atmosphere and allowing himself to blow up. Inspired by this selfless sacrifice (and the super-power left in its wake), the Atom would later adopt a costume patterned after Cyclotron's own.

Curtis' daughter, similarly named Terri, entered the custody of Firebrand and the Atom. The two served as godparents to Terri's baby, with Curtis' ex-lover Firebrand raising the child herself. Though cured of any potential radiation poisoning, Terri had evidently absorbed a large dose of her father's energy and passed the side-effects to her son Albert who became the hero Nuklon (later Atom Smasher).

Cyclotron II
In 2016, DC Comics implemented another relaunch of its books called "DC Rebirth", which restored its continuity to a form much as it was prior to "The New 52". An unnamed Cyclotron appears in the crossover series Justice League vs Suicide Squad where it's revealed he was a member of the initial Suicide Squad. On a mission, to Jagsun, he organized a double cross to take the island's God-Engine for themselves. For that, Amanda Waller first hired Lobo to kill him and then activated the bomb in his body, detonating him.

Powers and abilities
The first Cyclotron has immense strength, the ability to fly, project blasts of atomic energy, and manipulate matter on a molecular level. He can even sap his opponent's physique by touching him or her. As Terry, he possesses expertise in science. 

The second Cyclotron is capable of generating energies.

In other media
 A different Cyclotron was created exclusively for the line of Super Powers Collection action figures, and appeared in the third series of the comic book adaptation of the same name, in 1986. According to the back of his toy package, Cyclotron was an android built by Superman. He was then programmed with all the powers and weaknesses of every superhero and supervillain in order to be the Justice League's tactician. The package also notes that Cyclotron was capable of little independent thought, and that he uses the secret identity Alex LeWitt.
 A new figure reminiscent of the look presented by the Super Powers figure was released in the DC Universe Classics line in April 2010.

References

External links
 Cyclotron at Comic Vine

DC Comics characters with superhuman strength
DC Comics male supervillains
DC Comics metahumans
DC Comics scientists
DC Comics supervillains
Earth-Two
Characters created by Jerry Siegel
Characters created by Joe Shuster
Characters created by Roy Thomas
Fictional characters from parallel universes
Fictional characters with energy-manipulation abilities
Fictional characters with nuclear or radiation abilities
Comics characters introduced in 1940
Comics characters introduced in 1983
Golden Age supervillains